Gallimard may refer to:

Éditions Gallimard, a leading French book publishing company
Gallimard Jeunesse, a French publisher of children's books, a subsidiary of Éditions Gallimard
Découvertes Gallimard, an editorial collection published by Éditions Gallimard
Gaston Gallimard (1881−1975), French book publisher
Claude Gallimard (1914–1991), son of the former
Simone Gallimard (1914–1995), wife of Claude
Antoine Gallimard (born 1947) son of Claude and Simone
Christian Gallimard, (born 1944), brother of Antoine and his sisters
Isabelle Gallimard, sister 
Françoise Gallimard sister